Rudolf Winter was a sailor from Czechoslovakia, who represented his country at the 1928 Summer Olympics in Amsterdam, Netherlands.

Sources

External links
 

Sailors at the 1928 Summer Olympics – 12' Dinghy
Olympic sailors of Czechoslovakia
Czechoslovak male sailors (sport)
Year of birth missing
Possibly living people